The 2006 Louisiana Tech Bulldogs football team represented Louisiana Tech University as a member of the Western Athletic Conference (WAC) during the 2006 NCAA Division I FBS football season. Led by eighth-year head coach Jack Bicknell Jr., the Bulldogs played their home games at Joe Aillet Stadium in Ruston, Louisiana. Louisiana Tech finished the season with a record of 3–10 overall and a mark of 1–7 in conference play, tying for eighth place in the WAC.

Schedule

References

Louisiana Tech
Louisiana Tech Bulldogs football seasons
Louisiana Tech Bulldogs football